The Time Is Near is the third album by the Keef Hartley Band, released in 1970. Its cover art includes a rendition of the 1909 Cyrus Dallin statue Appeal to the Great Spirit.

Track listing

1970 LP
Deram SML 1071 (UK), DES 18047 (US)

All songs written by Miller Anderson, except "Premonition", written by Dave Caswell

 "Morning Rain" – 3:00
 "From The Window" – 3:28
 "The Time Is Near" – 10:09
 "You Can't Take It With You" – 7:19
 "Premonition" – 4:24
 "Another Time, Another Place" – 2:35
 "Change" – 4:00

Tracks 1, 7 recorded at Trident Studios in December 1969
Tracks 2–6 recorded at Morgan Studios in April and May 1970

2005 CD reissue
Eclectic Discs ECLDCD 1027 
Same track listing as the 1970 LP

Personnel

Keef Hartley Band
 Keef Hartley – drums, percussion
 Miller Anderson – vocals, acoustic guitar, electric guitar
 Henry Lowther – trumpet, flugelhorn, violin, piano, brass arrangements (tracks 1, 7)
 Gary Thain – bass guitar
 Dave Caswell – flugelhorn, euphonium, trumpet, electric piano, brass arrangements (tracks 2–6)
 Lyle Jenkins – tenor saxophone, flute, baritone saxophone (tracks 2–6)

Additional musicians
 Jim Jewell – tenor saxophone (tracks 1, 7)
 Stewart Wicks – piano, organ (tracks 2, 3)
 Del Roll – percussion (track 7)

Technical
 Keef Hartley, Neil Slaven – producers
 Robin Black – engineer, Morgan Studios
 Peter Flanagan – assistant engineer, Morgan Studios
 Colin Caldwell – engineer, Trident Studios
 Keef Hartley – album design

References 

1970 albums
Keef Hartley Band albums
Deram Records albums
Esoteric Recordings albums
Albums recorded at Trident Studios
Albums recorded at Morgan Sound Studios